In music, Op. 73 stands for Opus number 73. Compositions that are assigned this number include:

 Beethoven – Piano Concerto No. 5
 Brahms – Symphony No. 2
 Czerny – Variations on "Gott erhalte Franz den Kaiser"
 Draeseke – Tod und Sieg des Herrn
 Krenek – Karl V
 Novák – May Symphony
 Schumann – Fantasiestücke, Op. 73
 Shostakovich – String Quartet No. 3
 Strauss – Frohsinns-Spenden
 Weber – Clarinet Concerto No. 1